The 1926 Detroit Titans football team represented the University of Detroit in the 1926 college football season. Detroit was outscored by opponents by a combined total of 132 to 62 and finished with a 3–6–1 record in their second year under head coach and College Football Hall of Fame inductee, Gus Dorais.

Schedule

References

Detroit
Detroit Titans football seasons
Detroit Titans football
Detroit Titans football